Niur is an island in Riau province close to the east coast of Sumatra island, Indonesia. It is situated just south of Baso (island). The area of the island is 342 km².

References
http://islands.unep.ch/IHB.htm

Islands of Sumatra